Virtual Unrealities is a collection of  science fiction short stories by American writer Alfred Bester with an introduction by Robert Silverberg.

Contents
 "Disappearing Act"
 "Oddy and Id"
 "Star Light, Star Bright" (originally published in 1953, used as the title for two other compilations of Bester's short stories)
 "5,271,009" (originally published in 1954)
 "Fondly Fahrenheit" (originally published in 1954)
 "Hobson's Choice" (originally published in 1952)
 "Of Time and Third Avenue" (originally published in 1952)
 "Time is the Traitor" (originally published in 1953)
 "The Men Who Murdered Mohammed" (originally published in 1958) (Hugo Award Nominee)
 "The Pi Man" (originally published in 1959) (Hugo Award Nominee)
 "They Don't Make Life Like They Used To" (originally published in 1963)
 "Will You Wait?" (originally published in 1959)
 "The Flowered Thundermug" (originally published in 1964)
 "Adam and No Eve" (originally published in 1941)
 "And 3 1/2 to Go" (fragment - previously unpublished)
 "Galatea Galante" (originally published in 1979)
 "The Devil Without Glasses" (previously unpublished)

1997 short story collections
Short story collections by Alfred Bester